"Therapy" is a song recorded by American singer Mary J. Blige from her twelfth studio album, The London Sessions (2014). It was written by Blige, British singer Sam Smith and Eg White. Production was handled by White, Stephen Fitzmaurice, Rodney "Darkchild" Jerkins, and Jimmy Napes. "Therapy" is an uptempo pop song with strong influences from doo-wop and rhythm and blues. The song was released as album's lead single on September 23, 2014.

"Therapy" peaked at number 28 on the US Adult Contemporary chart.

Conception and release
"Therapy" was written by Blige and English musicians Sam Smith and Eg White. The pair was among a host of young British acts commissioned to work with Blige in London following the success of her version of "F for You", a remake of English electronic music duo Disclosure's fourth single from their debut studio album, Settle (2013), and her duet version of Smith's "Stay with Me". Initially composed for Smith's debut album In the Lonely Hour (2014), "Therapy" was already reference-vocaled when the White and Smith played it for Blige. Upon hearing it, Blige felt inspired: "It was like, 'OK. This is it. This is the first moment. This is the one that says I'm doing something different.' Slight lyrical and tonal changes were made to make it fit for her. On the process, Blige later elaborated: "At the end of the day, I pictured myself singing it. I went and sang the song. And it was perfect, 'cause I just felt like the message was universal. Because I think everybody needs a little bit. And it's not, you know, literally sitting in front of a doctor all the time. It could be whatever your therapy is. What works for you."

Composition
Musically, "Therapy" is an uptempo pop song with strong influences from doo-wop and rhythm and blues. Influences of gospel genres were also found in the song. It consists of a spacious beat, handclaps, a Hammond organ and the multitracked humming of co-writer Sam Smith. The instrumentation includes thumping drums, guitars, bass guitars, organs, and a piano. Andy Kellman from Allmusic magazine felt the song was "seemingly inspired more by Anthony Hamilton's Southern gospel-soul", while many other contemporary critics viewed the retro-soul sound of "Therapy" as a relative of and an answer to late English singer Amy Winehouse and her 2006 song "Rehab" on which she talked about her refusal to enter a rehabilitation clinic.

Music video
Blige filmed the music video for "Therapy" with director Sarah McColgan in early-October. It remains unreleased yet.

Credits and personnel
Credits adapted from the liner notes of The London Sessions.

Production: Stephen Fitzmaurice;  Rodney "Darkchild" Jerkins, Jimmy Napes, Eg White
Vocal production: Rodney "Darkchild" Jerkins
Background vocals: Sam Smith
Drums, guitar, organ: Eg White
Additional guitar: Ben Jones
Additional drums: Sylvester Earl Harvin
Additional bass: Jodi Milliner
Additional piano: Kieran McIntosh
Recording: Trehy Harris, Stephen Fitzmaurice
Recording assistance: Alex Robinson, Darren Heelis
Mixing: Tom Elmhirst, Rodney "Darkchild" Jerkins
Mixing assistance: Joe Viciano

Charts

Weekly charts

Release history

References

External links
 MaryJBlige.com — official website

2014 singles
2014 songs
Mary J. Blige songs
Capitol Records singles
Songs written by Eg White
Songs written by Mary J. Blige
Doo-wop songs